Kiapada is a village in Jajpur District of Odisha, India.  It is located at a distance of 120 km from Bhubaneswar, the capital city of Odisha.

References

Villages in Jajpur district